Mathura peda is a North Indian sweet dish that originated from Mathura in India. In North India sweets prepared from mawa (khoya) are very popular and the peda is also a mawa sweet variety. Mathura peda is so famous in North India that the term is often used in aphorism like Mathura ka peda au Chhattisgarh ka kheda means "(famous are) the peda sweet of Mathura and helmet in Chhattisgarh." Mathura acts as a brand name for peda sweet. While visiting Mathura, Mathura ke pede, Meva vati peda and export quality special peda attract the visitors.

Janmashtami feast
In Mathura, the birthplace of Krishna, Mathura ke pede is a favorite offering. These are made by cooking together fresh mawa, milk, sugar and ghee with cardamom powder for added flavour. In India Janmashtami holiday is considered incomplete without Peda. Every year on this day Peda are prepared to offer to Lord Krishna and break the fast

Global fame

At various tourist places even outside Mathura also, Mathura ke pede is the famous sweet all along with other Indian sweets like maner ke laddu and Agra ka petha.

The folklore taste

The taste of Mathura ke pede can be seen in Indian folklore also. "Mathura ke pede mohe lave, khilawe ji....."(he gives me the Mathura ka peda to eat) is the famous song among the Sand poojan (worship) songs in India.

As Geo-specialty prasada 

Mathura peda in the Braj Parikrama is geo-specialty prasada, just like the Kurukshetra Prasadam (Channa laddu) is in the 48 kos parikrama of Kurukshetra.

See also

Agra petha
Bikaneri bhujia
Kurukshetra Prasadam (Channa Laddu)
Peda

References

External links

 Nisha Madhulika
 Sanjeev Kapoor
 Youtube video

Indian desserts
Uttar Pradeshi cuisine
Indian cuisine by city
Geographical indications in Uttar Pradesh
Mathura